Polyadenylate-binding protein 4 (PABPC4) is a protein that in humans is encoded by the PABPC4 gene.

Function 

Poly(A)-binding proteins (PABPs) bind to the poly(A) tail present at the 3-prime ends of most eukaryotic mRNAs. PABPC4 or IPABP (inducible PABP) was isolated as an activation-induced T-cell mRNA encoding a protein. Activation of T cells increased PABPC4 mRNA levels in T cells approximately 5-fold. PABPC4 contains 4 RNA-binding domains and proline-rich C terminus. PABPC4 is localized primarily to the cytoplasm. It is suggested that PABPC4 might be necessary for regulation of stability of labile mRNA species in activated T cells. PABPC4 was also identified as an antigen, APP1 (activated-platelet protein-1), expressed on thrombin-activated rabbit platelets. PABPC4 may also be involved in the regulation of protein translation in platelets and megakaryocytes or may participate in the binding or stabilization of polyadenylates in platelet dense granules.

Model organisms 

				
Model organisms have been used in the study of PABPC4 function. A conditional knockout mouse line, called Pabpc4tm1a(KOMP)Wtsi was generated as part of the International Knockout Mouse Consortium program — a high-throughput mutagenesis project to generate and distribute animal models of disease to interested scientists.

Male and female animals underwent a standardized phenotypic screen to determine the effects of deletion. Twenty tests were carried out on mutant mice and one significant abnormality was observed: female homozygous mutants displayed impaired glucose tolerance.

Interactions 

PABPC4 has been shown to interact with PHLDA1.

References

Further reading 

 
 
 
 
 
 
 
 
 
 
 
 
 

Genes mutated in mice